"La Bachata" is a single by Colombian singer Manuel Turizo. Written by Turizo, Edgar Barrera, Andrés Jael Correa Rios, Miguel Andrés Martinez and Turizo's manager Juan Diego Medina, the song was released in May 2022 and reached number one in Argentina, Mexico, and on the US Billboard Latin Airplay charts.

Background 
"La Bachata", which replaces bachata's traditional guitar with electronic riffs and R&B vocals, debuted at number 44 on the US Billboard Latin Airplay chart on June 18, 2022.

The track eventually reached number six on the Global 200 and number three on the Global Excl. U.S. chart on the week of October 28, 2022, and in the same week, "La Bachata" became Turizo's fifth number-one on the US Latin Airplay chart.

As of October 28, 2022, the track has been number one on the Billboard Argentina Hot 100 for seven weeks.

Charts

Weekly charts

Year-end charts

Certifications

See also
List of Billboard Hot Latin Songs and Latin Airplay number ones of 2022

References 

2022 singles
2022 songs
Bachata songs
Manuel Turizo songs
Spanish-language songs